A Chiwara (also Chi wara, Ci Wara, or Tyi Wara;) is a ritual object representing an antelope, used by the Bambara ethnic group in Mali. The Chiwara initiation society uses Chiwara masks, as well as dances and rituals associated primarily with agriculture, to teach young Bamana men social values as well as agricultural techniques.

Stylistic variations 
Chiwara masks are categorized in three ways: horizontal, vertical, or abstract. In addition, Chiwara can be either male or female. Female Chiwara masks are denoted by the presence of a baby antelope and straight horns. Male Chiwara masks have bent horns and a phallus. The sex of a Chiwara mask is much clearer on horizontal and vertical masks while abstract masks tend to be difficult to classify.

The appearance of the Chiwara form varies greatly both by region and time produced. Specific master wood carvers also subtly modified the accepted (or even religiously mandated) local forms, forming a distinct "signature" or "school" of Chiwara figures.   These regional variations have been roughly assigned the stylistic categories above. Thus the Bougouni / Southern region style are an amalgam of several animal motifs combined in the same work, in an abstract style; the Bamako / Northern region style is usually of the horizontal style; the Segu/ Northern region style (the heartland of the Bambara Empire) matches the vertical style with the unique "cut out" triangular body motif of the males. Other regional styles have been proposed, including the Sikasso region style, with a thin, delicate, vertical form within almost human, snoutless face.

Ceremonial usage
In Bambara, chi wara means laboring wild animal, and is a representation of Bambara mythos about the creation of farming.

Mousso Koroni 
While there are several versions of the story, the discovery of agriculture is credited to the hero Chi Wara, a half antelope, half human figure born from the union of the earth goddess Mousso Koroni and the spitting cobra N'gorogo. The Chi Wara came to earth to teach humans to sow crops, and thus is honored at both sowing and harvest festivals.

The Chi Wara figure 
The Chi Wara itself is usually represented as a Roan Antelope with an almost human face, but also takes shapes of other creatures and emblems of farming. The hero descends from the sky goddess, and thus represents the sun, its body is often elongated and short legged to represent the aardvark who burrows into the earth like a farmer. Its high horns echo the stalks of millet, and it stands on a dancer clad in a mass of raffia stalks to represent both flowing water and a bountiful harvest. The zig-zag patterns echo the movement of the sun across the sky, and the penis of the male figure stands low to the ground, fertilizing the earth.
The Chi Wara figures always appear as a male/female pair, combining the elements of fertility of humans with fertility of the earth. The female figure usually carries a young antelope on her back, and is said to represent human beings carried by the Chi Wara hero, as well as a newborn human carried on a mother's back.

chi wara ton
As farmers of the upper Niger river savanna, the blessing of agriculture is of central importance to Bambara society. These traditions survive in part because the Bambara were one of the last cultures in the area to embrace Islam, after the fall of the Bambara Empire in the late 19th century. Bambara culture has traditionally had a strict set of age and caste fraternities (ton/jo/jow), and the chi wara ton society is one of the more important. It gathers all young adult males of the Soli age group to work the fields at clearing, sowing and harvest, when the greatest number of laborers is needed. Secret teachings of the chi wara ton pass the needed skills for this work, upon which the very survival of the community depends.

The chi wara ton is also the only major Bambara society which includes both sexes. Women's labor is needed for agriculture, just as both sexes are needed for human reproduction.

Dance 
The Chi Wara is always danced with each wooden figure attached to a basket on the dancer's head, and the body covered in a huge pile of raffia. Often the face is obscured with raffia that has been colored or decorated, and the dancer carries a long staff. The figures are always in one or more male/female pairs, with the female usually dancing behind the male, fanning him and spreading his powers into the gathered community. The Male figures leap to represent the antelope, and then scratch the earth with their staves or horns as the Chi Wara teaches humans to cultivate crops. In some communities the Mousso Koroni figure also appears. Initiated children wear a "Sogono Kuni" ("Little antelope head"), which is quite rare to find in museums.

World influence 
African sculptural forms became fashionable amongst European artists and collectors at the beginning of the Twentieth century, and the Chiwara, especially in its more abstract forms, became one of the icons of what Europeans called Primitive Art. The artist Guillaume Apollinaire and collector Paul Guillaume published images of the Chiwara in their Sculptures nègres in 1917, while Picasso, Braque, and Les Fauves became fascinated with African sculpture and masks in general, and the Chiwara figure in particular.

A vertical, male, semi-abstracted Chiwara figure was included in the 1935 Metropolitan Museum of Art exhibit African Negro Art, and the Masterpieces of African Art at the Brooklyn Museum in 1954, (as well as shows in London and Paris)  shows which were highly influential to western artists and collectors.  Variations of its triangular cut-out pattern are echoed in mid-20th century Modernist art, and its outline remains one of the most recognizable of African art forms.

References

 Dominique Zahan and Allen F. Roberts. The Two Worlds of Ciwara. In African Arts, Vol. 33, No. 2. (Summer, 2000), pp. 34–45+90-91].
Stephen R. Wooten. Antelope Headdresses and Champion Farmers: Negotiating Meaning and Identity through the Bamana Ciwara Complex. In African Arts, Vol. 33, No. 2 (Summer, 2000), pp. 18–33+89-90
Elisabeth Salzhauer Axel, Nina Sobol Levent. Art Beyond Sight: A Resource Guide to Art, Creativity, and Visual Impairment. AFB Press (2003). P.236. 
Thomas Buser. Experiencing Art Around Us. Thomson Wadsworth (2005). pp. 34–35. 
Pascal James Imperato. The Dance of the Tyi Wara. In African Arts, Vol. 4, No. 1. (Autumn, 1970), pp. 8–13+71-80.

Other reference works
Lillian E Pharr. Chi-Wara headdress of the Bambara: A select, annotated bibliography. Museum of African Art, Smithsonian Institution, Washington DC (1980). OCLC 8269403
Dominique Zahan. Antilopes du soleil: Arts et rites agraires d'Afrique noire. Edition A. Schendl, Paris (1980).

External links
Gallery BAMANA CHI WARA HEADDRESSES, MALI.
tyi wara: closeup images.
California State University: How do we distinguish between aesthetic analysis and investigating the cultural context of works of art?.
princetonol.com: Chi Wara Headdress of the Bamana.
University of Virginia.  ART IN CONTEXT: How is the Chi Wara Used?.
African Art Museum of the SMA Fathers at Tenafly, New Jersey: The Legend of Chi Wara.
www.masksoftheworld.com: Chi Wara mask images.
Library of the University of Virginia: Africa Masks exhibit. Includes images and description of one male and one female mask.
Humboldt State University: gallery of Chi Wara and other Bambara dancers.
The Metropolitan Museum of Art. Myths of Origin in African Sculpture. Press Release, February 3, 2003.
Genesis: ideas of origin in African sculpture, an exhibition catalog from The Metropolitan Museum of Art Libraries (fully available online as PDF), which contains material on chiwara
Raymond and Laura Wielgus Collection Eskenazi Museum of Art, Indiana University

Malian culture
African art
Masks in Africa
Bamana